Chasing Dreams is the debut album by English comedian, television presenter and actor Bradley Walsh.
 
Chasing Dreams may also refer to:

Books
Chasing Dreams, romantic novel by Susan Lewis (writer)
Chasing Dreams: Kathmandu Odyssey,  poetic play by Abhi Subedi
Chasing Dreams, 2008 novel in Chestnut Hill (novel series) created by Lauren Brooke

Film
Chasing Dreams (film), 1982 baseball film with early role by Kevin Kostner
Meraih Mimpi (Chasing Dreams), the Indonesian adaptation of Sing to the Dawn Gita Gutawa

Music
Chasing Dreams (band) Bo Stief

Albums
Chasing Dreams (微光) first Mandarin album by Kelly Chen 2010
Chasing Dreams, debut EP  2012 Kalin and Myles
Chasing Dreams EP, Magnet (musician) 2002

Songs
"Chasing Dreams", song by Magnet from  On Your Side (Magnet album)
"Chasing Dreams" (追梦), song by Baby Zhang
"Chasing Dreams", song by Gina Kiss Hungary in the Eurovision Song Contest 2012
"Chasing Dreams", song by Coldrain from The Revelation (Coldrain album)
"Chasing Dreams", D.O.D. (DJ) with Sandro Silva 2014
"Chasing Dreams", by Deadly Venoms

Other
Chasing Dreams Racing, a horse syndicate of 24 based in Kentucky Noble's Promise

See also
Chasing a Dream 2009 telefilm
Chasing the Dream (disambiguation)